Withering abalone syndrome is a disease of the abalone shellfish, primarily found in the black and red abalone species.

First described in 1986, it is caused by the bacterium "Candidatus Xenohaliotis californiensis", which attacks the lining of the abalone's digestive tract, inhibiting the production of digestive enzymes. To prevent starvation, the abalone consumes its own body mass, causing its characteristic muscular "foot" to wither and atrophy. This impairs the abalone's ability to adhere to rocks, making it far more vulnerable to predation. Withered abalone not eaten by predators typically starve.

For reasons not yet well understood, some abalone can be infected with the bacterium without developing the disease. It is believed, however, that changes in environmental conditions, such as warmer than normal water temperatures, may induce the disease in abalone that already harbor the bacterium. For this reason, the spread of the bacterium could lead to further declines in abalone populations, especially during El Niño events, when water temperatures rise.

Once a valuable fishery, abalone in Southern and Central California have been decimated by this disease. Some populations of black abalone have declined nearly 99 percent since the disease was first observed in the Channel Islands off Santa Barbara.

Resources 
California Sea Grant's Withering foot story

Further reading

Fish diseases
Syndromes in animals